Julio Gómez (born 1960 in Havana) is a Cuban-American businessman.

He is the founder of Gomez Advisors, acquired by Compuware Corporation in on November 9, 2009 for $295 million. He attended the Pennington School and graduated from Princeton University. He has founded several companies, and has been called "the unfounder" by the Boston Globe. He co-founded Innovation Councils, founded Gomez Markets, and Gomez Advisors. Ranked number 42 in Time Magazine's "Digital 50" and ranked one of the 50 most influential people on Wall Street by Institutional Investor.  Also known as "The Rank King" (Time).

References

External links
 Gomez Advisors

1960 births
Living people
Princeton University alumni
Cuban businesspeople
The Pennington School alumni